Ira Allen Chapel is a building on the campus of the University of Vermont (UVM), which is located on the northeast corner of the "University Green" in Burlington, Vermont (on the corner of Colchester Avenue and University Place).  The building was constructed during 1925–26, and dedicated on January 14, 1927.  It was added to National Register of Historic Places as part of University Green Historic District on April 14, 1975.

History 
Ira Allen Chapel was named after the University of Vermont's founder, Ira Allen.  Construction of the building was made possible by a $200,000 endowment from James Benjamin Wilbur, LL. D (1856–1929) of Manchester, VT in 1924.

Construction 
The cornerstone of the Ira Allen Chapel was installed on June 22, 1925 as part of the commencement activities that year.  An inscription which was carved into the granite reads; "Dedicated to the service of God erected in memory of the founder of this university Ira Allen - 1925".

The building was designed by the architect William Mitchell Kendall of McKim, Mead, and White of New York; the same architectural firm which designed the university's Waterman Building (built in 1941), Fleming Museum (1931), Southwick Building (1934), Slade Hall (1928), as well as Burlington City Hall (1928).  The building was erected under the supervision of builder, O.S. Nichols (of Essex Junction, VT).

Angell Hall (or the Angell House), originally built in 1869 to serve as the President's house (and later converted into a Women's dormitory in 1917) was demolished to make way for construction of the chapel.

In May 1926, the chapel's  bell, manufactured by the McShane Bell Foundry Company, Inc. of Baltimore, Maryland was installed in the belfry (for the total cost of $1,685).

During the construction of the chapel's tower, rumors had been circulated that it was unstable.  After some investigation engineers reported that the tower's structure was more than sufficient, explaining that the tower's interior corner wooden columns and their connecting castings over the top of the open arches were filled with reinforced concrete.

James B. Wilbur: Benefactor
James Benjamin Wilbur was a wealthy businessman and American history enthusiast who had made his fortune in ranching and banking in Colorado, and serving as president of the Royal Trust Company of Chicago until his retirement and move to Vermont in 1909.   During his retirement years he had amassed a substantial collection of documents pertaining to Vermont history.  In this time Wilbur discovered and developed keen intrigue in the historically controversial character of Ira Allen, subsequently resolving that it was "a sacred duty to undertake the writing of his life."  By 1920, Wilbur's collection of "Vermontiana" assisted him to begin writing Allen's biography, which was eventually published in 1928 as a two-volume work entitled: "Ira Allen: Founder of Vermont, 1751–1814".

In 1921, Wilbur first donated to the university a bronze statue monument of Ira Allen (sculpted by Sherry Edmundson Fry) upon a foundation of Barre Granite that was installed on the University Green in front of the university's "Old Mill" building facing west toward College St. and Lake Champlain.  The monument to General Lafayette, which was originally installed at this location in 1883 was moved to the north end of "the Green" (in proximity to where the Ira Allen Chapel stands today).

In 1924, Wilbur proposed an offer to the UVM Board of Trustees to build a chapel on conditions; that it be named the "Ira Allen Chapel", and that the chapel be sited and designed by the University's consulting architects at the time; McKim, Mead & White of New York City.

By 1929, Wilbur had also established a $3m endowment scholarship for the University (which still exists today), and donated his personal Vermontiana collection to the university; Today known as the Wilbur Collection, as well as a $100,000 provisional contribution for the construction of the Robert Hull Fleming Museum, and an additional $150,000 to construct the Wilbur room within the museum intended to house his collection.  Up until this point in time he had become the largest private benefactor in the university's history.  An ironic twist of fate lies in the fact that Ira Allen had left behind a damaged reputation with the university, having never followed up on his founding pledge of 4,000 pounds that was intended for the construction of the university's buildings.  However, Wilbur's ineffable devotion to Allen over a century later suggests that compensation was made for his fiduciary lapses, at least within the context of the university's history.

During the years of Wilbur's contributions, university president Guy Winfred Bailey (1876-1940) served as Wilbur's principal handler.

Pipe organ 

The original organ installed in the Ira Allen Chapel was a three-manual, electro-pneumatic Welte-Mignon Philharmonic Pipe Organ.  The manual compass was CC to C4 (61 notes).  The pedal compass was CCC to G (32 notes).  The wind chests of the manuals featured superoctave couplers (4'), which extended the compass of the keyboards to 73 notes.  There was also installed a reproducing console, which played recorded rolls in detail utilizing pedals, swells, and tempo characteristics of renown organists.

During the chapel's dedication ceremony of 14 January 1927, the organ was played by Dr. T. Tertius Noble, the organist of St. Thomas' Church of New York, who concluded the event with two organ recitals composed of classical pieces, and an original piece that was said to have demonstrated the capabilities of the instrument.

In 1985, the pipe organ was removed due to building renovations requiring the installation of a new airshaft in place of the organ's pipes.  The installation of a new pipe organ was estimated to cost in the millions of dollars, and was further anticipated to have complications due to the effect of varying temperature and humidity on the organ's intonation system.  The prospect was thus determined to be cost-prohibitive.   However, in August 2004, a new Rogers Trillium 3 digital electronic organ was installed (costing about $100,000).  Organ enthusiasts have argued against the authenticity of the digitally re-created pipe organ sound.

The University's desire for a new Chapel 
Chapel services on the university's campus from the 1830s onward were held in the chapel of the Main College building underneath its formerly erected central dome, in what is today is known as the John Dewey Lounge.   Although the chapel was enlarged during the 1882–83 modernization and renovation of the Main College building, throughout the ensuing 45 years the student population continued to grow beyond its capacity.  Furthermore, the inadequate heating system of the facility could not sufficiently heat the room for an "8:00 or 8:30 am service", which up to that point in time was a compulsory obligation.

By the early 1900s, attendance at the chapel services had become greatly reduced much to the dismay of the sitting university president of the day, Matthew Henry Buckham.  Although the president was said to have hated the word "compulsory", he nevertheless felt that everyone should attend chapel services.  However, this was impossible due to the chapel's limited capacity.  In 1910, a compulsory chapel attendance rule was enacted by the university, which mandated that all students attend services at least three times per week.  The rule was seen by the administration as a benefit to the school because all of the departments were regularly brought together.  Furthermore, the administration had an intention that someday daily attendance would be made possible by the fulfillment of what was then viewed as "one of the university's greatest needs"; a new chapel.

Soon after Buckham's passing in November 1910, it was reported in a university periodical that a memorial to Matthew Henry Buckham ought take the shape of a chapel; "It would be fitting, however, if in the coming years there shall be erected by the side of Morrill Hall, commemorating the service of a son of Vermont whom he loved, a memorial chapel bearing his name..."

Although this vision was never realized, fate eventually played out that the Ira Allen Chapel was to be built on the same spot where for almost 40 years, president Buckham had lived and worked (i.e. Angell House).  By the time of Ira Allen Chapel's design, it was intended that it serve as a meeting place to accommodate the entire student body, using reported figures from 1923 totaling 1146 students.

Architecture 

The building's footprint was constructed in the shape of a Latin cross.  There is a 170 ft. high (by 20 ft2) bell tower offset to the northwest corner of the nave of the main structure that is fitted with four clocks (one for each side of the tower) measuring eight feet in diameter.  At night, the beams from the electric lamp on the top tier of the tower are said to be visible from Mount Mansfield to the east (the highest summit in Vermont) to Mount Marcy from the west (the highest summit in the Adirondack mountains of New York State).

The length of the nave runs roughly east–west for 135 ft. at a 50 ft. width.  The 46 foot wide transepts of "the cross" extend perpendicular from the nave structure (i.e. north-south) for 20' 6".  Hence, the width of the main structure totals about 90 ft.  The floor area of the building is 39,141 ft2 (gross area) and 26,532 ft2 (finished area).  The main structure is 40 ft. high and has a slate roof.  Extending an additional 40 ft. above the roof and from the center of the building (e.g. the intersection of the nave and the transepts) is a low octagonal dome topped with a lantern and golden cupola.

The building was constructed using locally manufactured brick (from the Drury Brick and Tile Company of Essex Junction, Vermont) laid in English bond with ivory colored trim and topped with a gray-green slate roof.  The face of the main structure was fashioned in Greek Revival style with a portico installed with six 32 ft. Ionic columns.   The portico's pediment has a central traced elliptical window and flanking white swags.  Barre granite steps (roughly the width of the nave) ascend to the front entrance, which consists of three large doors leading to the inner vestibule.  The auditorium seats about 1,100 people, including 200 in the balconies.

The eastern facade of the building has a basement level which is five bays wide.

Additions and maintenance 

In 1945, the "Little Chapel" was constructed in the basement underneath the southern transept.  It was considered to be an architectural unit complete with cathedral glass, beamed ceiling, chancel floor, and leaded windows.  During 1954-55, the "Little Chapel" was renovated through the efforts of the Rev. Raymond A. Hall (a faculty member of the English department who was made the university chaplain in 1952) and with contributions from Mrs. and Mr. John E. Booth (who were primary contributors for the little chapel in 1945).  It was upgraded with a dossal, brass altar set, and a new lectern.  The chapel was built in cruciform with stained glass windows through which artificial light was cast.  With a seating capacity for about 40 people, the facility served as a worship center for numerous groups on campus.  However, on October 19, 1957, the UVM Board of Trustees voted to discontinue weekly chapel services held each Wednesday and replaced them with a weekly university convocation.  The decision was reached after a legal investigation concluded that such use of university facilities was technically a violation of the 3rd amendment of the Constitution of Vermont, which held that ". . . no man ought to, or of right can be compelled to attend any religious worship, or erect or support any place of worship, or maintain any minister, contrary to the dictates of his conscience. . ."

Due to the fact that UVM received funds from the State of Vermont as a state university, the use of tax dollars for support of religious services could have been construed as compelling the taxpayers to support a place of worship.  The Trustees further concluded that the primary use of the university's facilities ought to be for educational purposes with the allowance for denominational groups to utilize available facilities for worship services on campus provided they are billed for associated costs, such as; heat, lighting, custodial services, and depreciation.

On October 17, 1953, an electronic carillon was dedicated in the Ira Allen Chapel.  It was the first such carillon with the capability for tuning in both major and minor tonality, and which allowed for the carillonneur to vary the tonal coloring according to harmonic requirements.  Up to this point, electronic carillons could only be tuned to one tonality, thus preventing their bells from sounding in tune at all times.  The device consisted of eight large speakers mounted above the bells in the tower, a console with two manuals and 64 bells at the base of the tower, and four 50 watt amplifiers housed in the basement.  The $5,000 instrument was presented to the University by the Interfraternity Council and dedicated to UVM students who had fallen in combat while in service to their country.  However, the allotted funding for the carillon was obtained from proceeds of the ill-famed annual Kake Walk winter carnival event, a strange and "culturally racist" tradition which had its origins at the university during the mid-1880s (or prior). The event was officially ended on 1 November 1969.  The carillon was replaced in 1986.

While making major repairs to the chapel in 1954, a group of workers were trapped within the tower for four hours due to high winds that prevented their climbing down.

In June 1966, the outside of the chapel and bell tower were repainted and a new gold leaf was applied over the tower dome cupola; a project which had cost $6,000.

During 1971, renovations were made to the interior, which included extensive acoustical remodeling, enlargement of the stage area, and the addition of new seating (at an estimated cost of $500,000).
 

In 1972, the urn containing the ashes of Burlington native and world-renowned American philosopher and educational reformer John Dewey (UVM class of 1879), as well as the remains of his wife, Roberta Dewey were interred at a memorial adjacent to the north side of the building.  This is the only known grave site on the UVM campus.

In 1981, one of the original cornices had rotted out to about 25% of its original material.  It required Moose Creek Restoration a month to recreate the carved edifice in plaster and epoxy coating (weighing 200 pounds).

In early 1982, each of the four of the clocks on the tower had been displaying different times.  The University commissioned Pat Boyden (UVM class of 1967) to rebuild the clock mechanism and replace the clock hands with a lighter aluminum material.  Boyden further donated new hour and minute markings for the clocks.

During 1984-1986, major improvements totaling 30,000 square feet were made to the Ira Allen Chapel and Billings Library building, forming a combined Ira Allen–Billings Student Center.  A wing was constructed abutting the south transept of the Ira Allen Chapel at the basement level.  The roof of the wing serves as a patio adjoining the chapel to Billings.  An additional building known as the Campus Center Theatre was constructed, which abuts part of the north transept of the Chapel.  The back entrance of the theatre is accessible from the rear vestibule of Ira Allen Chapel.  The roof of the entryway serves as an open terrace and also connects the two buildings together.  It is accessible from the back of the auditorium (i.e. the first floor) of Ira Allen Chapel and from stairways from the east, and the north.  The front entrance of the Campus Center Theatre faces north toward Colchester Avenue.  These additions were designed by the architectural firm Shepley, Bulfinch, Richardson, and Abbott.

Subsequently, the basement of the Ira Allen Chapel was converted into a production area for the Vermont Cynic newspaper, the Aerial yearbook, and the Burlington Review publication.  The chapel was further outfitted with theatrical lighting, an enlarged stage area, and additional fire exits.  Also during this period, a new carillon was installed, replacing the 1953 instrument.  The new instrument had a range of almost four full octaves which were played from a two-tiered keyboard located in the chapel's choir loft.

In 1990, an extensive rehabilitation project of the bell tower took place, which consisted of stabilization and repainting of the tower and the belfry.

During the autumn of 2018, the original 32 foot spanish cedar columns of the main facade were removed and disposed due to deterioration; and the Barre granite stairway was demolished for refurbishment.  The university attempted to replace the columns with replicated steel support pillars encased in fiberglass.  However, as the university's historic structures were subject to the Vermont Act 250 land use statute, the Natural Resources Board, acting as the State's enforcement agency issued a letter ordering the university to cease construction work in January 2019; after six steel columns had been erected, but installed with only the leftmost four fiberglass sheaths (without any of the capitals or bases).  Pending a mitigation agreement with the Vermont Division for Historic Preservation to address the substantial disparity of the replacement building materials from the original materials, and the subsequent approval of the Act 250 District Coordinator, the project remains in stasis.

Although Ira Allen Chapel is no longer used for regular religious services, the facility hosts special campus events and ceremonies and has further been visited by many world-renowned speakers.

Notable appearances 
 Michele Norris, American radio journalist (25 January 2016)
 Al Gore, Former U.S. Vice-President (6 October 2015)
 Salman Rushdie, Author (14 January 2015)
 Billy Collins, Poet (2 October 2013)
 Slavoj Zizek, Marxist philosopher (16 October 2012)
 Bill McKibben, Environmental Journalist (13 October 2012)
 Sierra Leone's Refugee All Stars, Musical band (6 April 2010)
 Senator Barack Obama, U.S. Senator (10 March 2006)
 Matt Nathanson, Singer/Songwriter (20 January 2006)
 Mike Gordon and Leo Kottke, Musicians (5 November 2002)
 Widespread Panic, Rock band (9 March 1994)
 Turtle Island String Quartet, Jazz string quartet (30 March 1990)
 Spike Lee, film director, producer, writer, and actor (2 February 1990)
 Pearl Williams-Jones, Gospel singer (6 October 1989)
 Jesse Jackson, Politician, minister, and civil rights activist; and Mayor Bernie Sanders, Politician (11 February 1988)
 Elie Wiesel, Holocaust survivor, writer, and activist (13 October 1987)
 Russell Means, American Indian Movement Leader (11 September 1986)
 Jerry Brown, Politician (27 November 1979)
 Angela Davis, Political activist and author (28 September 1979)
 Jerry Rubin, Social activist and counterculture figure (28 September 1978)
 Gary Graffman, Classical pianist (8 July 1970)
 Senator Bernie Sanders, U.S. Senator (22 May 2022)

Gallery

References

External links 

  – University of Vermont

Buildings at the University of Vermont
University and college buildings on the National Register of Historic Places in Vermont
Churches completed in 1926
Churches in Burlington, Vermont
National Register of Historic Places in Burlington, Vermont
Historic district contributing properties in Vermont